Mr. Billings Spends His Dime is a lost 1923 American silent comedy film directed by Wesley Ruggles and written by Dana Burnet and Albert S. Le Vino. The film stars Walter Hiers, Jacqueline Logan, George Fawcett, Robert McKim, Patricia Palmer, and Josef Swickard. The film was released on March 19, 1923, by Paramount Pictures.

Cast 
Walter Hiers as John Percival Billings
Jacqueline Logan as Suzanna Juárez
George Fawcett as General Pablo Blanco
Robert McKim as Captain Gómez
Patricia Palmer as Priscilla Parker
Josef Swickard as Estaban Juárez
Guy Oliver	as John D. Starbock
Edward Patrick as White
Clarence Burton as Diego
George Field as Manuel
Lucien Littlefield as Martin Green

References

External links

 
 
 1922 Paramount Ad

1923 films
1920s English-language films
Silent American comedy films
1923 comedy films
Paramount Pictures films
Films directed by Wesley Ruggles
American black-and-white films
American silent feature films
Lost American films
1923 lost films
Lost comedy films
1920s American films